David Albright, M.Sc., is an American physicist and a weapons expert who is the founder of the non-governmental Institute for Science and International Security (ISIS), its current president, and author of several books on proliferation of atomic weapons. Albright holds a Master of Science in physics from Indiana University and an MSc in mathematics from Wright State University. He has taught physics at George Mason University in Virginia.

From 1990 to 2001, Albright was a member of the Colorado State Health Advisory Panel, participating in its assessment of the toxicological and radiological effects on the population near the Rocky Flats atomic weapons production site.

From 1992 to 1997, David Albright was associated with the International Atomic Energy Agency's Action Team. In June 1996, he was invited to be the first non-governmental inspector of Iraq's nuclear program and questioned Iraqi officials about that country's uranium enrichment program.

In 2001, Albright prepared an analysis, for CNN, of documents found in an abandoned Al Qaeda safe house in Kabul believed to have been used by Abu Khabbab, who they described as "Osama bin Laden's top chemical and biological weapons commander". Albright confirmed that the abandoned documents included plans for a nuclear bomb and extensive training notes on the handling of radiological material.

In September 2002, Albright and his organization ISIS were the first to publicly criticize the claims of the Bush administration and the CIA about the infamous Iraqi aluminum tubes. In response to Iraqi aluminum tubes, Albright said it was far from clear that the tubes were intended for a uranium centrifuge. The August/September 2003 American Journalism Review states: On December 8 [2002] Bob Simon reported on 60 Minutes that the aluminum tubes story was being challenged. He quoted British intelligence officials and David Albright, a weapons inspector in Iraq for the U.N. in the 1990s. Albright said, "People who understood gas centrifuges almost uniformly felt that these tubes were not specific to gas centrifuge use." Simon said to Albright: "It seems that what you're suggesting is that the administration's leak to the New York Times, regarding aluminum tubes, was misleading?" Albright: "Oh, I think it was. I think—I think it was very misleading.".Albright stated: "If the U.S. government puts out bad information it runs a risk of undermining the good information it possesses. In this case, I fear that the information was put out there for a short-term political goal: to convince people that Saddam Hussein is close to acquiring nuclear weapons."

Albright subsequently exposed flaws in the Bush administration's other so-called nuclear evidence in the run-up to the Iraq war. Prior to the start of the war, he also became sceptical that Iraq had sizeable stocks of chemical and biological weapons.

A National Journal profile in 2004 called Albright a "go-to guy for media people seeking independent analysis on Iraq's [weapons of mass destruction] programs".

In 2006, Albright received the prestigious Joseph A. Burton Forum Award from the American Physical Society, a professional society of American physicists. He was cited "For his tireless and productive efforts to slow the transfer of nuclear weapons technology. He brings a unique combination of deep understanding, objectivity, and effectiveness to this vexed area"

A report by Albright was quoted in a June 15, 2008 article in The Washington Post. He stated in a leaked copy of a draft report (to be released in full the week of June 15, 2008) that a nuclear weapons smuggling ring—which sold bomb-related parts to Libya, North Korea, and Iran—possessed plans to an advanced nuclear device, compact enough to fit on a ballistic missile used by Iran and a dozen other developing countries. It was unknown if these plans had been shared with any regime; and the plans had recently been destroyed.

Albright was a guest on The Colbert Report February 2011 and spoke about Stuxnet.

See also
 South Africa and weapons of mass destruction

References

External links
 http://isis-online.org/about/staff/albright/ – bio

Year of birth missing (living people)
Living people
Indiana University alumni
Wright State University alumni
George Mason University faculty
Fellows of the American Physical Society